= Postmodern communication =

Postmodern communication is used to describe the communication and messaging format, styles, guides, technologies and media used in a postmodernist world. Due to its non-traditional means; postmodern communication is also referred to as the information society. Driven by the need to reach influential audiences and to cut through a cluttered promotional marketplace, brands are reaching out to new communication methods to deliver their advertising message. Furthermore, many marketing practitioners are cited as saying that in order to create successful marketing strategies in the twenty-first century, "more creative thinking allied to an integrated approach to all communication activities are needed".

== Origins ==
The origin of postmodern communication is linked to the development of communication theory. As communication theory studies the technical process of information and the process of human communication, postmodern communications are the newly created tools and marketplaces that allow these communications to happen. Most thinking around the postmodern communication and marketing model is driven from an early 1990s scholastic journal article created by Stephen Brown and posted to the England Journal of Marketing. In it Brown writes, one who approaches marketing from postmodern style should in many ways reject attempts to impost order and working in silos. Instead markers should work collectively from with artistic attributes of intuition, creativity, spontaneity, speculation, emotion and involvement.

== Postmodern Communication Models ==
With the raise of the internet in the early 1960s and the explosive growth of social networking and mobile phones in the 1980 era, many more tactical postmodern communication models have been developed. Below is a short list on these new emerging messaging/communication models.

Model	Medium	Example
Real Time	Social	Hashtags, Twitter, Facebook
	IM	gChat, AOL IM
	Video Call	Skype, FaceTime,
	Location-Based Notification	Geofencing
Delayed Response	Email	
	Telemarketing	
Undirectional	TV	:30 sec ads
	Radio	Weather Alerts
	Print	Magazines

In adherence with postmodern communications one can assume that the current trend around marketing communication is within the real time model. Although this may be the case it is important to realize that these communication models do not accurately depict how brands and advertisers are spending in the space. According to leading advertising spending and research provider, spending around new aged "response" media is set at around 20% of total media spend, while unidirectional models make up roughly 80%.
